The Peace Implementation Council (PIC) is an international body charged with implementing the Dayton Peace Agreement for Bosnia and Herzegovina.  The Council was established at an implementation conference held in London, United Kingdom on December 8 and 9, 1995, subsequent to the completion of the negotiations of the accord the preceding month.  The Council is, in effect, the realization, through the High Representative for Bosnia and Herzegovina, of the international community's governance of Bosnia and Herzegovina after signature of the Dayton Agreement. This international control over Bosnia and Herzegovina is to last until the country is deemed politically and democratically stable and self-sustainable. 

The PIC comprises 55 countries and agencies that support the peace process in many different ways - by assisting it financially, providing troops for EUFOR Althea, or directly running operations in Bosnia and Herzegovina. There is also a fluctuating number of observers.

Since the London conference, the PIC has come together at the ministerial level another six times to review progress and define the goals of peace implementation for the coming period: in June 1996 in Florence, Italy; in December 1996 for a second time in London; in December 1997 in Bonn, Germany; in December 1998 in Madrid, Spain, in May 2000 and February 2007 in Brussels, Belgium. 

The PIC clarifies the responsibilities of the High Representative as the main implementing body of the civilian part of the Dayton Agreement, as set out in Annex 10 the Dayton Agreement. For example, the 1997 Bonn session provided the Office of the High Representative with the so-called "Bonn authority" to dismiss elected and non-elected officials who obstruct the implementation of the Dayton Agreement. The High Representative from 2006–2007, Christian Schwarz-Schilling, used this power sparingly, to promote confidence in elected domestic government. This strategy was reversed by the new appointee to that post, Miroslav Lajčák, who imposed several decisions on his first day at work.

Steering Board
The London peace implementation conference established the Steering Board of the PIC to work under the chairmanship of the High Representative as the executive arm of the PIC.

The Steering Board members are Canada, France, Germany, Italy, Japan, Russia, United Kingdom, United States, Presidency of the Council of the European Union, European Commission, and Organisation of the Islamic Conference, represented by Turkey.

The Steering Board provides the High Representative with political guidance. In Sarajevo, the High Representative chairs bi-weekly meetings of the Ambassadors to BiH of the Steering Board members. In addition, the Steering Board meets at the level of political directors every six months.

Controversies 
Prominent critics of PIC (such as Milorad Dodik, Serb member of the Presidency of Bosnia and Herzegovina) questions legality of PIC citing that this is an ad hoc body which has no basis in Annex 10 of the Dayton Agreement nor in the UN resolution 1031 (adopted by the United Nations Security Council at its 3607th meeting, on 15 December 1995) which are the legal basis for the role of UN's High Representative for Bosnia and Herzegovina. Issue with the legality of the this body was raised multiple times by Serb representatives in Bosnia and Herzegovina. This issue took centre stage in Bosnia and Herzegovina politics once again when Christian Schmidt was appointed to the role of UN High Representative without corresponding UN Security Council resolution. Being that all previous High Representatives were appointed by a UN Security Council as required by Annex 10 and UN resolution 1031 and that NATO countries circumvented this body by imposing new High Representative through PIC, thus circumventing Russian and Chinese veto, elected Serb representatives called this body an "instrument of international political violence" and "a body based on a bluff of NATO countries".

Members and participants

Countries
Albania, Austria, Belgium, Bosnia and Herzegovina, Bulgaria, Canada, China (resigned in May 2000), Croatia, Czech Republic, Denmark, Egypt, Federal Republic of Yugoslavia (succeeded by Serbia), Finland, France, Germany, Greece, Hungary, Ireland, Italy, Japan, Jordan, Luxembourg, North Macedonia, Malaysia, Morocco, Netherlands, Norway, Oman, Pakistan, Poland, Romania, Russian Federation, Saudi Arabia, Slovakia, Slovenia, Spain, Sweden, Switzerland, Turkey, Ukraine, United Kingdom and United States of America;

International organizations
Office of the High Representative, Brčko Arbitration Panel (dissolved in 1999 after the Final Award was issued), Council of Europe, European Bank for Reconstruction and Development, European Commission, International Committee of the Red Cross, International Criminal Tribunal for the former Yugoslavia, International Monetary Fund, North Atlantic Treaty Organization, Organization for Security and Co-operation in Europe, United Nations, UN High Commissioner for Human Rights, UN High Commissioner for Refugees, UN Transitional Administration of Eastern Slavonia (disbanded in January 1998), and the World Bank.

Observers
Australia, Central Bank of Bosnia and Herzegovina, European Investment Bank, Estonia, Holy See, Human Rights Ombudsperson in Bosnia and Herzegovina, Iceland, International Federation of Red Cross and Red Crescent Societies, International Mediator for Bosnia and Herzegovina, International Organization for Migration, Latvia, Lithuania, New Zealand, Liechtenstein, South Africa and the Stability Pact for South Eastern Europe.

See also
 International Steering Group for Kosovo

References

External links
 Office of the High Representative
 Presidency of Bosnia and Herzegovina

Diplomacy
High Rep
High Rep
Government of Bosnia and Herzegovina